Vilusi may refer to the following places:

Vilusi, Estonia, a village in Estonia
Vilusi, Banja Luka, a village near Banja Luka in Bosnia and Herzegovina
Vilusi (Gradiška), a village near Gradiška in Bosnia and Herzegovina
Vilusi, Nikšić, a village in Montenegro